The 1962 San Francisco State Gators football team represented San Francisco State College—now known as San Francisco State University—as a member of the Far Western Conference (FWC) during the 1962 NCAA College Division football season. Led by second-year head coach Vic Rowen, San Francisco State compiled an overall record of 6–2–1 with a mark of 3–1–1 in conference play, winning the FWC title. For the season the team outscored its opponents 135 to 102. The Gators played home games at Cox Stadium in San Francisco.

Schedule

Team players in the NFL / AFL
No San Francisco State players were selected in the 1963 NFL Draft.

The following finished their college career in 1962, were not drafted, but played in the AFL.

Notes

References

San Francisco State
San Francisco State Gators football seasons
Northern California Athletic Conference football champion seasons
San Francisco State Gators football